Framtia (The Future) is a local weekly Norwegian newspaper, published on Wednesdays in Ørnes in Nordland county. It covers events in the municipalities of Meløy and Gildeskål. 

The newspaper is published by Mediehuset Meløy AS, and it first appeared on July 4, 2008. Framtia obtained a press subsidy from the government after its first year of publication. The paper's chief editor and general manager is Ingunn Dahle.

Mediehuset Meløy AS also published the monthly profile magazine IndustriFolk, which is funded by partners in the business community of the Meløy region. Mediehuset Meløy AS had a turnover of NOK 4.8 million in 2015 and is owned by Edmund Ulsnæs (96%) and Meløy Økonomisenter (4%).

Circulation
According to the Norwegian Audit Bureau of Circulations and National Association of Local Newspapers, Framtia has had the following annual circulation:
2008: 1,047
2009: 1,234
2010: 1,276
2011: 1,326
2012: 1,345
2013: 1,403
2014: 1,678
2015: 1,728
2016: 1,675

References

External links
Framtia home page

Weekly newspapers published in Norway
Norwegian-language newspapers
Mass media in Nordland
Meløy
Newspapers established in 2008